Turun Palloseura (TPS) is one of the oldest sports clubs in Finland. It was founded in 1922 and floorball department was founded in 1995. The floorball department has over 850 members and it is the third largest floorball club in Finland. Men's team plays in Salibandyliiga and the women's team plays in Naisten Salibandyliiga, both on highest tiers of Finnish floorball.

History 
The history of TPS's department of floorball begun in 1995 when a team named I.K.A. SBS gave their position in the men's top floorball league to TPS. Also a large number of players from I.K.A. SBS transferred to TPS. However, TPS soon fell from the top league to the I-division. It was until the end of season 2006-07 when men won the I-division and rose again to Salibandyliiga.

External links 
 Official website

Finnish floorball teams
Turun Palloseura
Sport in Turku
1922 establishments in Finland